This is a list of compositions by Carlo Gesualdo (1566–1613), the Prince of Venosa.

Madrigals

Place and year of publication follows after the book number. Poet given in parentheses, if known. Madrigals are listed alphabetically by book.

Book I (Madrigali libro primo), op. 1, five voices. (Ferrara, 1594) 
 Baci soavi e cari (Giovanni Battista Guarini)
 Bella Angioletta, da le vaghe piume (Torquato Tasso)
 Come esser può ch'io viva (Alessandro Gatti)
 Felice primavera (Tasso)
 Gelo ha madonna il seno (Tasso)
 Madonna, io ben vorrei
 Mentre madonna il lasso fianco posa (Tasso)
 Mentre mia stella, miri
 Non mirar, non mirare (F. Alberti)
 O dolce mio martire
 Quanto ha di dolce amore
 Questi leggiadri odorosetti fiori
 Se da sí nobil mano (Tasso)
 Sí gioioso mi fanno i dolor miei
 Son sí belle le rose (Grillo)
 Tirsi morir volea (Guarini)

Book II (Madrigili libro secondo), op. 2, five voices. (Ferrara, 1594) 
 All'apparir di quelle luci ardenti
 Candida man qual neve
 Cara amoroso neo (Tasso)
 Dalle odorate spoglie
 Hai rotto e sciolto e spento
 In più leggiadro velo
 Non è questa la mano (Tasso)
 Non mai non cangerò
 Non mi toglia il ben mio
 O com'è gran martire (Guarini)
 Se così dolce e il duolo (Tasso)
 Sento che nel partire
 
 Se per lieve ferita
 Se taccio, il duol s'avanza (Tasso)

Book III (Madrigali libro terzo), op. 3, five voices. (Ferrara, 1595) 
 Ahi, disperata vita
 Ahi, dispietata e cruda
 Ancidetemi pur, grievi martiri
 Crudelissima doglia
 Deh, se già fu crudele
 Del bel de'bei vostri occhi
 Dolce spirto d'amore (Guarini)
 Dolcissimo sospiro (Annibale Pocaterra)
 Donna, se m'ancidente (six voices)
 Languisco e moro, ahi, cruda
 Meraviglia d'Amore
 Non t'amo, o voce ingrata
 Se piange, aime, la donna del mio core
 Se vi miro pietosa
 Voi volete ch'io mora (Guarini)
 
 Sospirava il mio core
 Veggio sí, dal mio sole

Book IV (Madrigali libro quarto), op. 5, five voices. (Ferrara, 1596) 
 Arde il mio cor, ed è si dolce il foco
 A voi, mentre il mio core
 Che fai meco, mio cor
 Cor mio, deh, non piangete (Guarini)
 Ecco, morirò dunque
 Il sol, qualor più splende (six voices)
 Io tacerò, ma nel silenzio mio
 Luci serene e chiare (Ridolfo Arlotti)
 Mentre gira costei
 Moro, e mentre sospiro
 Or, che in gioia credea
 Questa crudele e pia
 Se chiudete nel core
 Sparge la morte al mio Signor nel viso
 Talor sano desio

Book V (Madrigali libro quinto), op. 13, five voices. (Gesualdo, 1611) 
 Asciugate i begli occhi
 Correte, amanti, a prova
 Deh, coprite il bel seno (Ridolfo Arlotti)
 Dolcissima mia vita
 Felicissimo sonno
 Gioite voi col canto
 Itene, o miei sospiri
 Languisce al fin chi da la vita parte
 Mercè grido piangendo
 Occhi del mio cor vita (Guarini)
 O dolorosa gioia
 
 O tenebroso giorno
 O voi, troppo felici
 Poichè l'avida sete
 Qual fora, donna, un dolce 'Ohimè'
 Se tu fuggi, io non resto
 Se vi duol il mio duolo
 S'io non miro non moro
 T'amo mia vita, la mia cara vita (Guarini)
 Tu m'uccidi, oh crudele

Book VI (Madrigali libro sesto), op. 14, five voices. (Gesualdo, 1611) 
 Alme d'Amor Rubelle
 Al mio gioir il ciel si fa sereno
 Ancide sol la morte
 Ancor che per amarti
 Ardita Zanzaretta
 Ardo per te, mio bene
 Beltà, poi che t'assenti
 Candido e verde fiore
 Chiaro risplender suole
 Deh, come invan sospiro
 Già piansi nel dolore
 Io parto, e non più dissi
 Io pur respiro in cosí gran dolore
 Mille volte il dí moro
 Moro, lasso, al mio duolo
 
 O dolce mio tesoro
 Quando ridente e bella
 Quel 'no' crudel che la mia speme ancise
 Resta di darmi noia
 Se la mia morte brami
 Volan quasi farfalle
 Tu piangi, o Filli mia
 Tu segui, o bella Clori

Sacred works

Sacrae Cantiones I, op. 9, five voices. (1603) 
 Ave, Regina coelorum
 Venit lumen tuum Jerusalem
 Ave, dulcissima Maria
 Reminiscere miserationum tuarum
 Dignare me, laudare te
 Sancti Spiritus Domine
 Domine ne despicias
 Hei mihi Domine
 Laboravi in gemitu meo
 Peccantem me quotidie
 O vos omnes
 Exaudi Deus deprecationem meam
 Precibus et meritis beatae Mariae
 O Crux benedicta
 Tribularer si nescirem
 Deus refugium et virtus
 Tribulationem et dolorem
 Illumina faciem tuam
 Maria mater gratiae

Sacrae Cantiones II, op. 10, six, seven voices. (1603) 
 Virgo benedicta
 Da pacem Domine
 Sana me Domine
 Ave sanctissima Maria
 O Oriens
 Discedite a me omnes
 Gaudeamus omnes
 Veni Creator Spiritus
 O sacrum convivium
 Adoramus te Christe
 Veni sponsa Christi
 Assumpta est Maria
 Verba mea
 Ardens est cor meum
 Ne derelinquas me
 O Beata Mater
 Ad te levavi
 Franciscus humilis et pauper
 O anima sanctissima
 Illumina nos
 The Bassus and Sextus parts of Sacrae Cantiones II were lost; a reconstruction was published in 2013 by James Wood.

Responsoria et alia ad Officium Hebdomadae Sanctae spectantia, for six voices (1611) 
 Contains, apart from a setting of all 27 Tenebrae Responsoria, a setting of Psalm 51 and of the Benedictus.

References

External links
 

Gesualdo, Carlo